Gérard Jean Nédellec is a French medical doctor, who served as the French Surgeon General 2009-2012 and the 6th chairman of the Committee of Chiefs of Military Medical Services in NATO.

After attending the Collège naval 1966–1969, he studied medicine at the Ecole du Service de santé des armées in Bordeaux 1969-1975 and qualified as a hematologist. His senior appointments in the French Defence Health Service (Service de santé des armées - SSA) included chief of the hematology service at the Val-de-Grâce and Percy military hospitals from 1988 to 2004, on the Hospital Staff at SSA headquarters (Direction centrale du SSA),  and as Director of St. Anne Hospital in Toulon 2007–2009. He served as Surgeon General (Directeur central du SSA) from 2009 to 2012. Following his 2012 election by the allied Surgeons General as chairman of the Committee of Chiefs of Military Medical Services in NATO, he served as NATO's principal medical adviser until his retirement in 2015. He is a Commander in the French Legion of Honour.

References

Year of birth missing (living people)
Living people
French military doctors
French surgeons